Atyrau, known until 1991 as Guryev, is a city in Kazakhstan and the capital of Atyrau Region.

Atyrau is famous for its oil and gas industries. It has a population of 355,117 as of 2020. It is predominantly made up of Kazakhs, the minorities being Russians, Koreans, Tatars and Uzbeks.

History
The wooden fort at the mouth of the Yaik River was founded in 1645 as Nizhny Yaitzky gorodok (literally, Lower Yaik Fort) by the Russian trader Gury Nazarov, a native of Yaroslavl, who specialized in trade with Khiva and Bukhara. The fort was plundered by the Yaik Cossacks, leading the Guriev family to rebuild it in stone (1647–62). Tsar Alexis sent a garrison of Streltsy to protect the fort from Cossack incursions. Despite these efforts, the Cossack rebel Stepan Razin held the town in 1667 and 1668. The fort gradually lost its strategic significance and was demolished in 1810. Between 1708 and 1992 the city was known as Guriev. The Kazakh name Atyrau means 'river delta'.

Two parts of the world have the city. The side of Samarskaya (right side of the river) lies in Europe and the left bank of Bukharskaya is in Asia. It was established in 1615, by the employer Mikhail Guriev, who applied the decree to tzar Mikhail Fedorovich for a monopoly in the mouth of Ural to fish sturgeons.

Origin of the name 
Murzaev E. Dictionary of popular geographical terms (1984) states:
"The branched coast of a large lake or sea, on which appeared the bay and islands, the estuaries of rivers and capes. The north-eastern coast of the Caspian Sea, including its alyp, the locals still call Atyrau."

A. Nurmaganbetov and M. Khobdabayev states:
"The word atyrau, which earlier means "island", also grasps the concept of the word saga -" the mouth of the river, "and this is natural, whatever the river, at the point where it enters the ocean or the sea, its mouth branches out, and between each branch appears dry We think that this is the main reason for joint use of Atyrau together with the "mouth of the river".
Ecological Kazakh-Russian dictionary (2001) states:
Atyrau is a tract, a cane shoal in the mouth of the Urals.

Geography
Atyrau (together with Aktau) is Kazakhstan's main harbour city on the Caspian Sea, Atyrau at the delta of the Ural River. The city is considered to be located both in Asia and Europe, as it is divided by the Ural River.
The city is a hub for the oil-rich Caspian Depression; because of this, many oil wells have been drilled in the Tengiz Field and Kashagan Field areas. An oil pipeline runs from Atyrau to Samara, where it joins the Russian pipeline system. A separate oil pipeline runs from the Tengiz field to the Russian Black Sea port of Novorossiisk.

Demographics
At the beginning of 2020, the population of the city is 290,700 people, 355,117 people in the territory of the city akimat.

National composition (at the beginning of 2020):

Kazakhs - 313 534 people (88.29%)
Russians - 29 466 people (8.30%)
Koreans - 2 987 people (0.84%)
Tatars - 1 934 people (0.54%)
Uzbeks - 1 320 people (0.37%)
Ukrainians - 709 people (0.20%)
Karakalpaks - 700 people (0.20%)
Azerbaijanis - 510 people (0.14%)
Germans - 406 people (0.11%)
Karachais - 357 people (0.10%)
Dargins - 229 people (0.06%)
Belarusians - 210 people (0.06%)
Bulgarians - 197 people (0.06%)
Others - 2 558 people (0.72%)
In total - 355,117 people.

Climate

Atyrau's climate is semi-arid (Köppen climate classification BSk), just shy of being classified as arid (Köppen climate classification BWk), with hot summers and cold winters. Precipitation is low throughout the year. Snow is common, though light in winter. It is much more continental than areas further west on the European continent, with summers characterized by temperatures averaging  and lack of precipitation, resembling continental hot-summer mediterranean climates, and subarctic winters with little snow but with chilling temperatures. These vast temperature swings are more comparable to Siberia and the North American plains.

Industry

Oil industry
The third biggest refinery in Kazakhstan is located in Atyrau. Atyrau Refinery is operated by KazMunayGas and has a capacity of 16,600 m³/day (2012). A deep oil refining complex is under construction which is the final stage of complete reconstruction of Atyrau Oil Refinery. This project is designed to process 2.4 million tons/year of raw materials (oil and vacuum gas oil). The project will increase the depth of the oil processing at the refinery by 2016 to 85%. The volume of oil refining will reach 5.5 million tons per year.

Atyrau is located near Tengiz field, which is operated in part by Chevron. Most families of Chevron employees live in Dostyk village, a compound that includes housing, recreational facilities, and an international school. Atyrau also has expatriate populations working for Agip, ExxonMobil, Royal Dutch Shell, and ConocoPhillips.

Education
There are three major institutions of higher education in Atyrau (all state-owned): Atyrau Institute of Engineering and Humanities, Atyrau Institute of Oil and Gas, and Atyrau State University.

Sports
The city is home to the basketball team BC Barsy Atyrau. The team competes in the international FIBA Asia Champions Cup and the Kazakhstan Basketball Championship. It plays its home games at the Sports and Recreation complex Atyrau. There's a multi-use stadium called Munaishy Stadium, which is mostly used for football matches and it's home to the football club FC Atyrau. The stadium's capacity is 8,690 spectators.

Transportation

Air

Atyrau Airport  serves the city of Atyrau. The airport is located 8 km northwest of Atyrau. The airport hosts 6 airlines, mostly operating domestic flights, and is the focus city of the flag carrier airline Air Astana. In 2019, it was the 5th busiest airport in Kazakhstan, as 937,032 people had passed the airport in that year. There are some international destinations, such as flights to Moscow, operated by Aeroflot, Amsterdam and Istanbul, both operated by Air Astana.

Railway

There is a railway station, located northeast of Atyrau. There are mainly domestic routes, such as routes to large cities Almaty, Aktobe and Nur-Sultan, but there's also international routes, such as a route to Russian cities Astrakhan, Saratov, Moscow, Volgograd and Tajikistani cities Kulob, Khujand, Dushanbe and Uzbekistan's capital Tashkent.

International relations

Twin towns 
Atyrau is twinned with:

  Aktau, Kazakhstan  
  Oral, Kazakhstan  
  Aktobe, Kazakhstan  
  Shirvan, Azerbaijan
  Astrakhan, Russia  
  Syktyvkar, Russia  
  Magnitogorsk, Russia  
  Aberdeen, United Kingdom
  Ashdod, Israel
  Ashgabat, Turkmenistan

Bridges of Atyrau 
On August 28, 1965, the first real reinforced concrete bridge in the city, passing through the Ural River, was built and put into operation. The bridge connects Satpayev Avenue and Abay Street. On the right European coast on Satpayev Avenue, the akimat (mayor's office) of the city and akimat (governor) of the Atyrau region adjoin the bridge.

In 2001, a unique pedestrian suspension bridge was built. The  bridge is listed in the Guinness Book of Records as the longest pedestrian bridge in the world. From the middle of the bridge over the Urals there are views of Azattyk Avenue and its surroundings.

See also
 Beibarys Atyrau
 Atyrau Football Club
 Atyrau Airport
 Radio Tandem

References

External links

City administration website
Information site on Kazakhstan
Photos Atyrau 

 
Populated places in Atyrau Region
Ural Oblast (Russian Empire)
Populated places established in 1640
Populated places on the Caspian Sea
1640 establishments in Russia
Cities and towns in Kazakhstan
Transcontinental cities
Port cities and towns of the Caspian Sea